The Château de Joyeuse Garde is the site of a castle associated with Joyous Gard from Arthurian legend. Its ruins in the town of La Forest-Landerneau in Brittany date to the 6th century. It was listed as a monument historique on 6 October 1975.

The castle is the subject of "Joyeuse Garde", an 1859 poem by Algernon Charles Swinburne.

Gallery

References

Castles in Brittany
Ruined castles in France
Monuments historiques of Finistère
Chateau De Joyeuse Garde